The Old town of Visoki was a medieval royal castle town built during the 14th century on the top of the hill overlooking town of Visoko, Bosnia and Herzegovina. The first mention of the town was on 1 September 1355, in the charter "in castro nosto Visoka vocatum" written by Tvrtko I of Bosnia while he was a young ban. The town was presumably abandoned before 1503, as it is not mentioned in the Turkish-Hungarian treaty from the mentioned year. In 1626, Đorđić mentioned Visoki among abandoned towns.

Location and size

Its position provides an excellent view at the plains below. The entry to the castle is on the southwest side, with two lookout towers. Its position provides an excellent view at the plains below bordered by the mountains Romanija, Jahorina, Treskavica and Bjelašnica in the east and southeast, Bitovnja in the south, the mountain Zec and Vranica in the Southeast, Vlašić in the west, and Tajan and Zvijezda in the north.

Historic importance
The primary function of the old town of Visoki was defense, but it was also a place where a lot of medieval Bosnian rulers issued various documents and charters. The first mention of the town itself was in a charter written by the young Tvrtko I named in castro nosto Visoka vocatum on 1 September 1355. The final document of importance signed there was by Tvrtko Borovinić in 1436, showing that it was also of high importance to Bosnian nobility.

List of written documents
 1355 – Tvrtko I Kotromanić writes charter in castro nostro Visoka vocatum.
 1398 – Priboje Masnović, duke who was accepted as Ragusa citizen.
 1402 – Bosnian king Stjepan Ostoja writes charter pod gradom Visoki (beneath town Visoki).
 1404 – Bosnian king Ostoja writes charter pod Visokim (beneath Visoki).
 1404 – Two papers were published which were subject of law dispute in Ragusa.
 1420 – Great Bosnian duke Batić Mirković became very ill; he was buried in village of Kopošići.
 1429 and 1436 – Duke Tvrtko Borovinić written papers na Visokom (on Visoki). These papers were last direct sources of old town of Visoki.

See also
 Visoko
 Visoko during the Middle Ages
 History of Bosnia and Herzegovina

References

External links
 Old town of Visoki becomes a national landmark 

History of Visoko
Buildings and structures in Visoko
Castles in Bosnia and Herzegovina
National Monuments of Bosnia and Herzegovina
Archaeological sites in Bosnia and Herzegovina
Medieval Bosnia and Herzegovina architecture